Nadd or NADD may refer to:

 Nad, County Cork, Ireland, a village, also spelled 'Nadd'
 Freedon Nadd, a Star Wars Legends character 
 National Alliance for Democracy and Development, a political alliance in The Gambia
 National Association for the Dually Diagnosed, United States, advocates for people with mental health disorders alongside developmental disabilities 
 National Association for the Deaf and Dumb, predecessor of the British Deaf Association, a charity